The 2022 Men's Indoor Hockey Asia Cup was the ninth edition of the Men's Indoor Hockey Asia Cup, the biennial international men's indoor hockey championship of Asia organized by the Asian Hockey Federation. It was held alongside the women's tournament held at the Indoor Stadium Huamark in Bangkok, Thailand from 8 to 15 August 2022.

Iran were the defending champions, winning all previous editions but were ultimately defeated by Malaysia by tieing up 4–4 but losing 3–2 in the shootouts making Malaysia the first team other than Iran to win a title at the Men's Indoor Hockey Asia Cup. Kazakhstan won the bronze medal after defeating Indonesia 5–4.

Teams

Preliminary round

Standings

Matches

Classification round

Fifth place match

Third place match

Final

Final standing

See also
 2022 Men's Hockey Asia Cup
 2022 Women's Indoor Hockey Asia Cup

References

Indoor Hockey Asia Cup
Asia Cup
International field hockey competitions hosted by Thailand
Indoor Hockey Asia Cup
Indoor Hockey Asia Cup
Indoor Hockey Asia Cup